Labor Days is the third studio album by American hip hop artist Aesop Rock. It was released by Definitive Jux on September 18, 2001. It is a concept album about work. The album's production was handled by Aesop Rock, Blockhead, and Omega One.

"Labor" was featured on the soundtrack of Tony Hawk's Pro Skater 4.

Critical reception

At Metacritic, which assigns a weighted average score out of 100 to reviews from mainstream critics, Labor Days received an average score of 92 based on 5 reviews, indicating "universal acclaim."

In 2010, Rhapsody included it on its "10 Best Albums by White Rappers" list. In 2015, Fact placed it at number 17 on its "100 Best Indie Hip-Hop Records of All Time" list.

Track listing

Personnel
Credits adapted from liner notes.

 Aesop Rock – vocals, production (1, 6, 9, 10), recording
 Illogic – vocals (6)
 C-Rayz Walz – vocals (11)
 Blockhead – production (2, 3, 4, 5, 7, 11, 12, 13, 14)
 Omega One – production (8), turntables
 Cryptic One – mixing
 Emily Lazar – mastering
 Dan Ezra Lang – art direction, design
 Owen Brozman – illustration
 Ben Colen – photography

References

External links
 

2001 albums
Definitive Jux albums
Aesop Rock albums
Albums produced by Aesop Rock
Concept albums
Albums produced by Blockhead (music producer)